John en Marsha was a Philippine television sitcom that aired on the Radio Philippines Network (RPN) from May 1973 to July 30, 1990. Created by Adíng Fernando, the series starred Dolphy, Nida Blanca, Rolly Quizon, Tiya Dely Atay-Atayan and Maricel Soriano.

A spin-off from the series, John en Shirley, aired on ABS-CBN in 2006 with Dolphy and Maricel Soriano reprising their roles from the original series.

Plot
Marsha Jones marries the impoverished John Puruntong, much to the dismay of her wealthy mother, Doña Delilah. The latter often pays a visit to their house along with her serving-maid Matutina. When money was needed, she would tell Matutina to go sweep peso bills off the floor.

Despite this, John rejects all the financial assistance Doña Delilah offers his family, resulting in a hilarious exchange of insults between the two. The show usually ends with Doña Delilah screaming her catchphrase "Kaya ikaw, John, magsumikap ka!" ("Therefore, John, you must work hard!") to insult John's capability as the father of the household. They end up making amends, giving each other abrupt hugs with Doña Delilah exclaiming "Peace, man!"

Cast

Dolphy+ as John H. Puruntong
Nida Blanca+  as Marsha J. Puruntong (John's wife)
Dely Atay-Atayan+ as Doña Delilah G. Jones (John's mother-in-law)
Evelyn Bontogon-Guerrero as Matutina (Doña Delilah's maid and sidekick)
Rolly Quizon+ as Rolly J. Puruntong (eldest son)
Maricel Soriano and Sheryl Cruz as Shirley J. Puruntong (daughter)
Madel de Leon as Madel Puruntong (daughter-in-law)
Atong Redillas as John-John J. Puruntong (son; Vandolph played the role in the spin-off John en Shirley)
Isko Salvador as Isko (the neighborhood storekeeper and Shirley's suitor)

Films
The series spawned multiple movie incarnations from 1974 to 1991:
John & Marsha (1974)
John & Marsha sa Amerika (Part Two) (1975)
John & Marsha '77 (1977)
John & Marsha '80 (1980)
Da Best of John en Marsha sa Pelikula (1983)
Da Best of John & Marsha sa Pelikula Part II (1984)
John & Marsha '85 (Sa Probinsya) (1985)
John & Marsha '86:  TNT sa Amerika (1986)
John en Marsha Ngayon '91 (1991)

Songs used
Aside from "Rubber Ducky" by Quincy Jones, "Don't Stop Till You Get Enough" by Michael Jackson was also used.

See also
List of programs previously broadcast by Radio Philippines Network
Home Along Da Riles
Stan Freberg

External links

References

1970s Philippine television series
1973 Philippine television series debuts
1980s Philippine television series
1990 Philippine television series endings
1990s Philippine television series
Philippine television sitcoms
Radio Philippines Network original programming
Filipino-language television shows